David Hockney  (born 9 July 1937) is an English painter, draftsman, printmaker, stage designer, and photographer. As an important contributor to the pop art movement of the 1960s, he is considered one of the most influential British artists of the 20th century.

Hockney has owned residences and studios in Bridlington, and London, as well as two residences in California, where he has lived intermittently since 1964: one in the Hollywood Hills, one in Malibu, and an office and archives on Santa Monica Boulevard in West Hollywood, California.

On 15 November 2018, Hockney's 1972 work Portrait of an Artist (Pool with Two Figures) sold at Christie's auction house in New York City for $90 million (£70 million), becoming the most expensive artwork by a living artist sold at auction. This broke the previous record, set by the 2013 sale of Jeff Koons's Balloon Dog (Orange) for $58.4 million. Hockney held this record until 15 May 2019 when Koons reclaimed the honour selling his Rabbit for more than $91 million at Christie's in New York.

Early life and education
David Hockney was born in Bradford, West Riding of Yorkshire, England, to Laura and Kenneth Hockney, a conscientious objector in the Second World War, the fourth of five children. He was educated at Wellington Primary School, Bradford Grammar School, Bradford College of Art (where his teachers included Frank Lisle and his fellow students included Derek Boshier, Pauline Boty, Norman Stevens, David Oxtoby and John Loker) and the Royal College of Art in London, where he met R. B. Kitaj. While there, Hockney said he felt at home and took pride in his work. 

At the Royal College of Art, Hockney featured – alongside Peter Blake – in the exhibition Young Contemporaries, which announced the arrival of British Pop art. He was associated with the movement, but his early works display expressionist elements, similar to some works by Francis Bacon. When the RCA said it would not let him graduate if he did not complete an assignment of a life drawing of a live model in 1962, Hockney painted Life Painting for a Diploma in protest. He had refused to write an essay required for the final examination, saying he should be assessed solely on his artworks. Recognising his talent and growing reputation, the RCA changed its regulations and awarded the diploma. After leaving the RCA, he taught at Maidstone College of Art for a short time. He taught at the University of Iowa in 1964. Hockney also taught at the University of Colorado, Boulder in 1965. Then taught at the University of California, Los Angeles from 1966 to 1967, followed by the University of California, Berkeley in 1967.

Career
In 1964, Hockney moved to Los Angeles, where he was inspired to make a series of paintings of swimming pools in the comparatively new acrylic medium using vibrant colours. He lived back and forth among Los Angeles, London, and Paris in the late 1960s to 1970s. In 1974 he began a decade-long personal relationship with Gregory Evans who moved with him to the US in 1976 and as of 2019 remains a business partner. In 1978 he rented a house in the Hollywood Hills, and later bought and expanded it to include his studio. He also owned a 1,643-square-foot beach house at 21039 Pacific Coast Highway in Malibu, which he sold in 1999 for around $1.5 million.

In the 1990s, Hockney returned more frequently to Yorkshire, usually every three months, to visit his mother who died in 1999. Until 1997, he rarely stayed for more than two weeks, when his friend Jonathan Silver, who was terminally ill, encouraged him to capture the local surroundings. He did this at first with paintings based on memory, some from his boyhood. In 1998, he completed the painting of the Yorkshire landmark, Garrowby Hill. Hockney returned to Yorkshire for longer and longer stays, and by 2003 was painting the countryside en plein air in both oils and watercolour. The oil paintings he produced after 2005 were influenced by his intensive studies in watercolour, a series titled Midsummer: East Yorkshire (2003–2004). He created paintings made of multiple smaller canvases—two to fifty—placed together. To help him visualise work at that scale, he used digital photographic reproductions to study the day's work.

In spring 2020 Hockney stayed at La Grande Cour, a farmhouse and studio in Normandy, during the global COVID-19 pandemic.

Work
Hockney has experimented with painting, drawing, printmaking, watercolours, photography, and many other media including a fax machine, paper pulp, computer applications and iPad drawing programs. The subject matter of interest ranges from still lifes to landscapes, portraits of friends, his dogs, and stage designs for the Royal Court Theatre, Glyndebourne, and the Metropolitan Opera in New York City.

Portraits

Hockney has returned to painting portraits throughout his career. From 1968, and for the next few years, he painted portraits and double portraits of friends, lovers, and relatives just under life-size in a realistic style that adroitly captured the likenesses of his subjects. Hockney has repeatedly been drawn to the same subjects – his family, employees, artists Mo McDermott and Maurice Payne, various writers he has known, fashion designers Celia Birtwell and Ossie Clark (Mr. and Mrs. Clark and Percy, 1970–71), curator Henry Geldzahler, art dealer Nicholas Wilder, George Lawson and his ballet dancer lover, Wayne Sleep, and also his romantic interests throughout the years, including Peter Schlesinger and Gregory Evans. Perhaps more than all of these, Hockney has turned to his own figure year after year, creating over 300 self-portraits.

From 1999 to 2001 Hockney used a camera lucida for his research into art history as well as his own work in the studio. He created over 200 drawings of friends, family, and himself using this antique lens-based device.

In 2016, the Royal Academy exhibited Hockney's series entitled 82 Portraits and 1 Still-life which traveled to Ca' Pesaro in Venice, Italy, and the Guggenheim Museum Bilbao, in 2017 and to the Los Angeles County Museum of Art in 2018. Hockney calls the paintings started in 2013 "twenty-hour exposures" because each sitting took six to seven hours on three consecutive days.

Printmaking 
Hockney experimented with printmaking as early as a lithograph Self-Portrait in 1954 and worked in etchings during his time at RCA. In 1965, the print workshop Gemini G.E.L. approached him to create a series of lithographs with a Los Angeles theme. Hockney responded by creating The Hollywood Collection, a series of lithographs recreating the art collection of a Hollywood star, each piece depicting an imagined work of art within a frame. Hockney went on to produce many other portfolios with Gemini G.E.L. including Friends, The Weather Series, and Some New Prints. During the 1960s he produced several series of prints he thought of as 'graphic tales', including A Rake's Progress (1961–63) after Hogarth, Illustrations for Fourteen Poems from C.P. Cavafy (1966) and Illustrations for Six Fairy Tales from the Brothers Grimm (1969).

In 1973 Hockney began a fruitful collaboration with Aldo Crommelynck, Picasso's preferred printer. In his atelier, he adopted Crommelynck's trademark sugar lift, as well as a system of the master's own devising of imposing a wooden frame onto the plate to ensure colour separation. Their early work together included Artist and Model (1973–74) and Contrejour in the French Style (1974). In 1976–77 Hockney created The Blue Guitar, a suite of 20 etchings, each utilising Crommelynck's techniques and filled with references to Picasso. The frontispiece to the suite mentions Hockney's dual inspiration; "The Blue Guitar: Etchings By David Hockney Who Was Inspired By Wallace Stevens Who Was Inspired By Pablo Picasso". The etchings refer to themes in a poem by Wallace Stevens, "The Man with the Blue Guitar". It was published by Petersburg Press in October 1977. That year, Petersburg also published a book, in which the images were accompanied by the poem's text.

In the summer of 1978, David Hockney stayed 6 weeks with his friend the printer Ken Tyler at Tyler's studio in New York, Tyler Graphics Ltd. Tyler invited Hockney to try a new technique with liquid paper. The process is painting with the paper itself, so the artist had to do it himself by hand. Each image becomes a unique work between printmaking and painting. In 6 weeks, Hockney created a total of 29 artworks with a series of 17 sunflowers and swimming pools. Many of the works are very similar, differentiated by changes in colour choice and application of the colour. Some are solely coloured using paper pulp, while some use spray paint to achieve certain details.

Some of Hockney's other print portfolios include Home Made Prints (1986), Recent Etchings (1998) and Moving Focus (1984–1986), which contains lithographs related to A Walk Around the Hotel Courtyard, Acatlan. A retrospective of his prints, including 'computer drawings' printed on fax machines and inkjet printers, was exhibited at Dulwich Picture Gallery in London 5 February – 11 May 2014 and Bowes Museum, County Durham 7 June – 28 September 2014, with an accompanying publication Hockney, Printmaker by Richard Lloyd.

Photocollages
In the early 1980s, Hockney began to produce photo collages—which, in his early explorations within his personal photo albums, he referred to as "joiners"—first using Polaroid prints and subsequently 35mm, commercially processed colour prints. Using Polaroid snaps or photolab-prints of a single subject, Hockney arranged a patchwork to make a composite image. Because the photographs are taken from different perspectives and at slightly different times, the result is work that has an affinity with Cubism, one of Hockney's major aims—discussing the way human vision works. Some pieces are landscapes, such as Pearblossom Highway #2, others portraits, such as Kasmin 1982, and My Mother, Bolton Abbey, 1982.

Creation of the "joiners" occurred accidentally. He noticed in the late 1960s that photographers were using cameras with wide-angle lenses. He did not like these photographs because they looked somewhat distorted. While working on a painting of a living room and terrace in Los Angeles, he took Polaroid shots of the living room and glued them together, not intending for them to be a composition on their own. On looking at the final composition, he realised it created a narrative, as if the viewer moved through the room. He began to work more with photography after this discovery, stopping painting for a while to pursue this new technique exclusively
.

Over time, however, he discovered what he could not capture with a lens, saying: "Photography seems to be rather good at portraiture, or can be. But, it can't tell you about space, which is the essence of landscape. For me anyway. Even Ansel Adams can't quite prepare you for what Yosemite looks like when you go through that tunnel and you come out the other side." Frustrated with the limitations of photography and its 'one-eyed' approach, he returned to painting.

Other technology
In December 1985 Hockney used the Quantel Paintbox, a computer program that allowed the artist to sketch directly onto the screen. The resulting work was featured in a BBC series that profiled several artists. In 1999–2001, David's sister, Margaret, began experimenting with digital photography, scanning and computer printing, particularly making images of flowers scanning a small Japanese vase and fresh flowers. In 2003, she was experimenting with Photoshop, scanning summer flowers and building up images in layers which Margaret printed out on an A3 printer. In 2004, David went to stay with Margaret and she helped him scan his sketchbook of Yorkshire landscape and David soon began using a Wacom pad and pen directly into Photoshop.

Since 2009, Hockney has painted hundreds of portraits, still lifes and landscapes using the Brushes iPhone and iPad application, often sending them to his friends. In 2010 and 2011, Hockney visited Yosemite National Park to draw its landscape on his iPad. He used an iPad in designing a stained glass window at Westminster Abbey which celebrated the reign of Queen Elizabeth II. Unveiled in September 2018, the Queen's Window is located in the north transept of the Abbey and features a hawthorn blossom scene which is set in Yorkshire.

From 2010 to 2014, Hockney created multi-camera movies using three to eighteen cameras to record a single scene. He filmed the landscape of Yorkshire in various seasons, jugglers and dancers, and his own exhibitions within the de Young Museum and the Royal Academy of Arts.

Hockney's earlier photocollages influenced his shift to another medium, digital photography. He combined hundreds of photographs to create multi-viewpoint "photographic drawings" of groups of his friends in 2014. Hockney picked the process back up in 2017, this time using the more advanced Agisoft PhotoScan photogrammetric software which allowed him to stitch together and rearrange thousands of photos. The resulting images were printed out as massive photomurals and were exhibited at Pace Gallery and LACMA in 2018.

Plein air landscapes 
In June 2007, Hockney's largest painting, Bigger Trees Near Warter or/ou Peinture sur le Motif pour le Nouvel Age Post-Photographique, which measures , was hung in the Royal Academy's largest gallery in its annual Summer Exhibition. This work "is a monumental-scale view of a coppice in Hockney's native Yorkshire, between Bridlington and York. It was painted on 50 individual canvases, mostly working in situ, over five weeks last winter." In 2008, he donated it to Tate in London, saying: "I thought if I'm going to give something to the Tate I want to give them something really good. It's going to be here for a while. I don't want to give things I'm not too proud of... I thought this was a good painting because it's of England... it seems like a good thing to do." The painting was the subject of a BBC1 Imagine film documentary by Bruno Wollheim called David Hockney: A Bigger Picture (2009) which followed Hockney as he worked outdoors over the preceding two years.

Theatre works
Hockney's first stage designs were for Ubu Roi at London's Royal Court Theatre in 1966, Stravinsky's The Rake's Progress at the Glyndebourne Festival Opera in England in 1975, and The Magic Flute for Glyndebourne in 1978. In 1980, he agreed to design sets and costumes for a 20th-century French triple bill at the Metropolitan Opera House with the title Parade. The works were Parade, a ballet with music by Erik Satie; Les mamelles de Tirésias, an opera with libretto by Guillaume Apollinaire and music by Francis Poulenc, and L'enfant et les sortilèges, an opera with libretto by Colette and music by Maurice Ravel. The reimagined set of L'enfant et les sortilèges from the 1983 exhibition Hockney Paints the Stage is a permanent installation at the Spalding House branch of the Honolulu Museum of Art. He designed sets for another triple bill of Stravinsky's Le sacre du printemps, Le rossignol, and Oedipus Rex for the Metropolitan Opera in 1981 as well as Richard Wagner's Tristan und Isolde for the Los Angeles Music Center Opera in 1987, Puccini's Turandot in 1991 at the Chicago Lyric Opera, and Richard Strauss's Die Frau ohne Schatten in 1992 at the Royal Opera House in London. In 1994, he designed costumes and scenery for twelve opera arias for the TV broadcast of Plácido Domingo's Operalia in Mexico City. Technical advances allowed him to become increasingly complex in model-making. He also used a computerised setup that let him punch in and program lighting cues at will and synchronise them to a soundtrack of the music.

In 2017, Hockney was awarded the San Francisco Opera Medal on the occasion of the revival and restoration of his production for Turandot.

The majority of Hockney's theatre works and stage design studies are found in the collection of The David Hockney Foundation.

Exhibitions
David Hockney has been featured in over 400 solo exhibitions and over 500 group exhibitions. He had his first one-man show at Kasmin Limited when he was 26 in 1963, and by 1970 the Whitechapel Gallery in London had organised the first of several major retrospectives, which subsequently travelled to three European institutions. LACMA also hosted a retrospective exhibition in 1988 which travelled to The Met, New York, and Tate, London. In 2004, he was included in the cross-generational Whitney Biennial, where his portraits appeared in a gallery with those of a younger artist he had inspired, Elizabeth Peyton.

In October 2006, the National Portrait Gallery in London organised one of the largest ever displays of Hockney's portraiture work, including 150 paintings, drawings, prints, sketchbooks, and photocollages from over five decades. The collection ranged from his earliest self-portraits to work he completed in 2005. Hockney assisted in displaying the works and the exhibition, which ran until January 2007, was one of the gallery's most successful. In 2009, "David Hockney: Just Nature" attracted some 100,000 visitors at the Kunsthalle Würth in Schwäbisch Hall, Germany.

From 21 January 2012 to 9 April 2012, the Royal Academy presented A Bigger Picture, which included more than 150 works, many of which take entire walls in the gallery's brightly lit rooms. The exhibition is dedicated to landscapes, especially trees and tree tunnels of his native Yorkshire. Works included oil paintings, watercolours, and drawings created on an iPad and printed on paper. Hockney said, in a 2012 interview, "It's about big things. You can make paintings bigger. We're also making photographs bigger, videos bigger, all to do with drawing." The exhibition drew more than 600,000 visitors in under 3 months. The exhibition moved to the Guggenheim Museum in Bilbao, Spain from 15 May to 30 September, and from there to the Ludwig Museum in Cologne, Germany, between 27 October 2012 and 3 February 2013.

From 26 October 2013 to 30 January 2014 David Hockney: A Bigger Exhibition was presented at the de Young Museum, one of the Fine Arts Museums of San Francisco. The largest solo exhibition Hockney has had, with 397 works of art in more than 18,000 square feet, was curated by Gregory Evans and included the only public showing of The Great Wall, developed during research for Secret Knowledge, and works from 1999 to 2013 in a variety of media from camera lucida drawings to watercolours, oil paintings, and digital works.

From 9 February to 29 May 2017 David Hockney was presented at the Tate Britain, becoming the most-visited exhibition in the gallery's history. The exhibition marked Hockney's 80th year and gathered together "an extensive selection of David Hockney's most famous works celebrating his achievements in painting, drawing, print, photography and video across six decades". The show then travelled to Centre Georges Pompidou in Paris and The Metropolitan Museum of Art. The wildly popular retrospective landed among the top ten ticketed exhibitions in London and Paris for 2017 with over 4,000 visitors per day at the Tate and over 5,000 visitors per day in Paris.

After the blockbuster exhibitions in 2017 of the works of decades past, Hockney went on to display his newest paintings on hexagonal canvases and mural-size 3D photographic drawings at Pace Gallery in 2018. He revisited paintings of Garrowby Hill, the Grand Canyon, and Nichols Canyon Road, this time painting them on hexagonal canvases to enhance aspects of reverse perspective. In 2019, his early work featured in his native Yorkshire at The Hepworth Wakefield.
In April–June 2022 an exhibition "Hockney's Eye: The Art and Technology of Depiction" was held at the Fitzwilliam Museum, Cambridge and at the city's Heong Gallery.

Personal life
Hockney came out as gay at the age of 23, while studying at the Royal College of Art in London. Britain decriminalised homosexual acts seven years later in the Sexual Offences Act 1967. Hockney has explored the nature of gay love in his work, such in as the painting We Two Boys Together Clinging (1961), named after a poem by Walt Whitman. In 1963 he painted two men together in the painting Domestic Scene, Los Angeles, one showering while the other washes his back. In the summer of 1966, while teaching at UCLA, he met Peter Schlesinger, an art student who posed for paintings and drawings, and with whom he became romantically involved. Another of Hockney's romantic partners was the subject of his work was Gregory Evans; the two met in 1971 and began a relationship in 1974. While no longer romantically involved, they still work together, with Evans managing the David Hockney Studio. Hockney's current partner is longtime companion Jean-Pierre Gonçalves de Lima. Also known as JP, he also works with Hockney in his studio as his chief assistant.

On the morning of 18 March 2013, Hockney's 23-year-old assistant, Dominic Elliott, died as a result of drinking drain cleaner at Hockney's Bridlington studio; he had also earlier drunk alcohol and taken cocaine, ecstasy and temazepam. Elliott was a first- and second-team player for Bridlington Rugby Club. It was reported that Hockney's partner drove Elliott to Scarborough General Hospital where he later died. The inquest returned a verdict of death by misadventure and Hockney was never implicated. In November 2015 Hockney sold his house in Bridlington, a five-bedroomed former guest house, for £625,000, cutting all his remaining ties with the town.

He holds a California Medical Marijuana Verification Card, which enables him to buy cannabis for medical purposes. He has used hearing aids since 1979, but realised he was going deaf long before that. As of 2018, he kept fit by spending half an hour in the swimming pool each morning, and could stand for six hours at the easel.

Hockney has synaesthetic associations between sound, colour and shape.

Collections
Many of Hockney's works are housed in the 1853 Gallery at Salts Mill in Saltaire, near his hometown of Bradford. Another large group of works are held by The David Hockney Foundation. His work is in numerous public and private collections worldwide, including:

 Honolulu Museum of Art
 Museum of Fine Arts, Boston
 National Gallery of Australia, Canberra
 Art Institute of Chicago
 Museum of Fine Arts, Houston
 Louisiana Museum of Modern Art, Humlebæk, Denmark
 National Portrait Gallery, London
 Tate, U.K.
 J. Paul Getty Museum, Los Angeles
 Los Angeles County Museum of Art
 Walker Art Center, Minneapolis
 Metropolitan Museum of Art, New York
 Museum of Modern Art, New York
 Centre Georges Pompidou, Paris
 Fine Arts Museums of San Francisco
 Museum of Contemporary Art, Tokyo
 Aboa Vetus & Ars Nova, Turku, Finland
 Mumok, Ludwig Foundation, Vienna
 Hirshhorn Museum and Sculpture Garden, Washington, D.C.
 Smithsonian American Art Museum, Washington, D.C.
 Muscarelle Museum of Art, Williamsburg, VA

Recognition
In 1967, Hockney's painting, Peter Getting Out of Nick's Pool, won the John Moores Painting Prize at the Walker Art Gallery in Liverpool. Hockney was offered a knighthood in 1990 but declined, before accepting an Order of Merit in January 2012. He was awarded The Royal Photographic Society's Progress medal in 1988 and the Special 150th Anniversary Medal and Honorary Fellowship in recognition of a sustained, significant contribution to the art of photography in 2003. He was made a Companion of Honour in 1997 and awarded The Cultural Award from the German Society for Photography (DGPh). He is a Royal Academician. In 2012, he was appointed to the Order of Merit, an honour restricted to 24 members at any one time for their contributions to the arts and sciences.

He was a Distinguished Honoree of the National Arts Association, Los Angeles, in 1991 and received the First Annual Award of Achievement from the Archives of American Art, Los Angeles, in 1993. He was appointed to the board of trustees of the American Associates of the Royal Academy Trust, New York in 1992 and was given a Foreign Honorary Membership to the American Academy of Arts and Sciences, Cambridge, Massachusetts in 1997. In 2003, Hockney was awarded the Lorenzo de' Medici Lifetime Career Award of the Florence Biennale, Italy.

Commissioned by The Other Art Fair, a November 2011 poll of 1,000 British painters and sculptors declared him Britain's most influential artist of all time. In 2012, Hockney was among the British cultural icons selected by artist Sir Peter Blake to appear in a new version of his most famous artwork – the Beatles' Sgt. Pepper's Lonely Hearts Club Band album cover – to celebrate the British cultural figures of his life that he most admires.

He is an honorary member of the Printmakers Council.

Art market
On 21 June 2006, Hockney's painting The Splash sold for £2.6 million. It was offered for auction again on 11 February 2020, with an estimate of £20–30 million and sold, to an unknown buyer, for £23.1 million.

His A Bigger Grand Canyon, a series of 60 canvases that combined to produce one enormous picture, was bought by the National Gallery of Australia for $4.6 million.

Beverly Hills Housewife (1966–67), a 12-foot-long acrylic that depicts the collector Betty Freeman standing by her pool in a long hot-pink dress, sold for $7.9 million at Christie's in New York in 2008, the top lot of the sale and a record price for a Hockney. This was topped in 2016 when his Woldgate Woods landscape made £9.4 million at auction.

The record was broken again in 2018 with the sale of Piscine de Medianoche (Paper Pool 30) for $11.74 million and then doubled in the same Sotheby's auction when Pacific Coast Highway and Santa Monica sold for $28.5 million.

On 15 November 2018, David Hockney's 1972 painting Portrait of an Artist (Pool with Two Figures) sold at Christie's for $90.3 million with fees, surpassing the previous auction record for a living artist of $58.4 million, held by Jeff Koons for one of his Balloon Dog sculptures. He had originally sold this painting for $20,000 in 1972.

The Hockney–Falco thesis

In the 2001 television programme and book Secret Knowledge, Hockney posited that the Old Masters used camera obscura as well as camera lucida and lens techniques that projected the image of the subject onto the surface of the painting. Hockney argues that this technique migrated gradually from Northern Europe to Italy, and is the reason for the photographic style of painting we see in the Renaissance and later periods of art. He published his conclusions in the 2001 book Secret Knowledge: Rediscovering the Lost Techniques of the Old Masters, which was revised in 2006.

Public life
Like his father, Hockney was a conscientious objector, and worked as a medical orderly in hospitals during his National Service, 1957–1959.

Hockney was a founder of the Museum of Contemporary Art, Los Angeles, in 1979.  He serves on the advisory board of the political magazine Standpoint, and contributed original sketches for its launch edition, in June 2008, as well as agreeing to allow Standpoint to publish his previous views and pictures over the years.

He is a staunch pro-tobacco campaigner and was invited to guest-edit BBC Radio's Today programme on 29 December 2009 in which he aired his views on the subject. In 2013 he wrote a foreword and provided illustrations for a book by John Staddon, Unlucky Strike.

In October 2010, he and a hundred other artists signed an open letter to the Secretary of State for Culture, Media and Sport, Jeremy Hunt, protesting against cutbacks in the arts.

In popular culture

In 1966, while working on a series of etchings based on love poems by the Greek poet Constantine P. Cavafy, Hockney starred in a documentary by filmmaker James Scott, entitled Love's Presentation. He was the subject of Jack Hazan's 1974 biopic, A Bigger Splash, named after Hockney's 1967 pool painting of the same name. Hockney was also the inspiration of artist Billy Pappas in the documentary film Waiting for Hockney (2008), which debuted at the Tribeca Film Festival in 2008.

Hockney was inducted into Vanity Fairs International Best-Dressed Hall of Fame in 1986. In 2005, Burberry creative director Christopher Bailey centred his entire spring/summer menswear collection around the artist and in 2012, fashion designer Vivienne Westwood, a close friend, named a checked jacket after Hockney. In 2011, British GQ named him one of the 50 Most Stylish Men in Britain and in March 2013, he was listed as one of the Fifty Best-dressed Over-50s by The Guardian.

Hockney was commissioned to design the cover and pages for the December 1985 issue of the French edition of Vogue. Consistent with his interest in cubism and admiration for Pablo Picasso, Hockney chose to paint Celia Birtwell (who appears in several of his works) from different views for the cover, as if the eye had scanned her face diagonally.

David Hockney: A Rake's Progress (2012) is a biography of Hockney covering the years 1937–1975, by writer/photographer Christopher Simon Sykes.

In 2012, Hockney featured in BBC Radio 4's list of The New Elizabethans to mark the diamond Jubilee of Queen Elizabeth II. A panel of seven academics, journalists and historians named Hockney among the group of people in the UK "whose actions during the reign of Elizabeth II have had a significant impact on lives in these islands and given the age its character".

The 2015 Luca Guadagnino's film A Bigger Splash was named after Hockney's painting.

In 2022, he was portrayed by Laurence Fuller in the 7th episode of the 1st season of Minx.

David Hockney Foundation
The David Hockney Foundation—both the UK registered charity 1127262 and the US 501(c)(3) private operating foundation—was created by the artist in 2008.  In 2012, Hockney, worth an estimated $55.2 million (approx. £36.1 m), transferred paintings valued at $124.2 million (approx. £81.5 m) to the David Hockney Foundation, and gave an additional $1.2 million (approx. £0.79 m) in cash to help fund the foundation's operations.

The foundation's mission is to advance appreciation and understanding of visual art and culture through the exhibition, preservation, and publication of David Hockney's work.  Richard Benefield, who organised David Hockney: A Bigger Exhibition in 2013–2014 at the de Young Museum in San Francisco, became the first executive director in January 2017.

The foundation owns over 8,000 works – paintings, drawings, watercolours, complete editioned prints, stage design, multi-camera movies, and other media.  They also hold 203 sketchbooks and Hockney's personal photo albums from 1961 to 1990.  The foundation manages various loans to museums and exhibitions around the world, including Happy Birthday, Mr. Hockney! at the Getty celebrating his 80th birthday, and the retrospective exhibitions of 2017–2018 at the Metropolitan Museum, Centre Georges Pompidou, and Tate Britain.

Books

By Hockney 
 
 
 
 
 
 
 
 
 
 
 
 
 
 
 
 
 
  
 
 
 
 
 
 
 
 
 
 

In October 2016 Taschen published David Hockney: A Bigger Book, costing £1,750 (£3,500 with an added loose print). The artist curated the selection of more than 60 years of his work reproduced within 498 pages. The book, weighing 78 lbs, had gone through 19 proof stages. The book came with an (optional) substantial wooden lectern. He unveiled the book at the Frankfurt Book Fair where he was the keynote speaker at the opening press conference.

Contributions by Hockney

References

Further reading
 Weschler, L. Cameraworks (with David Hockney – photographer) (1984) Alfred A. Knopf, (portions of the essay by Weschler appeared in the New Yorker in a slightly different form), 
 Geldzahler, H., Knight, C., Kitaj, R. B., Schiff, G., Hoy, A., Silver, K. E. and Weschler, L. David Hockney: A Retrospective (Painters & sculptors) (1988), Thames and Hudson, London, 
 Shanes, E. Hockney Posters (with David Hockney), (1988), Crown Publishing Group, 
 Luckhardt, U. and Melia, P. David Hockney: A Drawing Retrospective (1995), Thames and Hudson, London, 
 Livingstone, M. David Hockney: Space and Line (1999), Annely Juda Fine Art, London, 
 Livingstone, M. David Hockney: Painting on Paper (2002), Annely Juda Fine Art, London, 
 Livingstone, M. David Hockney: Egyptian Journeys (2002), American University in Cairo Press, Cairo, 
 Frémon, J David Hockney, Close and far (2001) 
 Howgate, S. David Hockney Portraits (2006), National Portrait Gallery, 
 Melia, P. and Luckhardt, U. David Hockney: Paintings (2007), Prestel, Munich, 
 Becker, C. and Livingstone, M. David Hockney (2009), Swiridoff Verlag, Künzelsau, 
 Sykes, C. S. Hockney: The Biography (2011), Century, 
 Seckiner, S. South (Güney), published July 2013, consists of 12 article and essays.  One of them, American Collectors, re-focus on David Hockney's importance in the philosophy of art. .
 Dagen, P. David Hockney, The Arrival of Spring in Woldgate (2015) 
 Didier Ottinger, Pictures of Daily Life, Galerie Lelong & Co. (2018)
 Frémon, J, David Hockney en pays d'Auge, L'Echoppe, (2020)

External links

 
 
 The David Hockney Foundation
 David Hockney's Long Road From Los Angeles to Yorkshire, The New York Times, 15 October 2009
 Hockney Yorkshire Wolds Art Locations

 
1937 births
Living people
20th-century British painters
20th-century British photographers
20th-century English painters
21st-century British photographers
21st-century English painters
20th-century English male artists
21st-century English male artists
Academics of the University for the Creative Arts
Alumni of Chelsea College of Arts
Alumni of the Royal College of Art
Artist authors
Artists from Bradford
Artists from California
British conscientious objectors
British pop artists
Deaf artists
English contemporary artists
English expatriates in the United States
English male painters
English printmakers
Gay painters
Gay photographers
English LGBT photographers
English LGBT painters
English gay artists
Members of the Order of Merit
Members of the Order of the Companions of Honour
Neo-expressionist artists
The New Yorker people
Opera designers
People educated at Bradford Grammar School
Photographers from Yorkshire
Postmodern artists
Recipients of the Praemium Imperiale
Royal Academicians